Gothenburg English Studio Theatre (GEST) is a professional English-speaking theatre in western Sweden, and currently the only one of its kind in that region. The theatre produces contemporary English speaking theatre, mostly with actors and directors from Britain. It is located in Majorna, which is a district in the city of Gothenburg. It is a non-profit theatre. GEST works and performs both in Sweden and internationally. GEST has, in recent years, developed a Creative Learning Department, which collaborates with schools, colleges and universities by leading workshops and after show discussions.

History 
GEST was founded in 2005 by Kristina Brändén Whitaker and Gary Whitaker, both actors and directors from England, and has been located in its own theatre space at Chapmans Torg in Gothenburg since 2012. The theatre participated in the Edinburgh Fringe Festival in 2010 and was awarded 'The Fringe Review Award for Outstanding Theatre' for its original production of Kristina Brändén Whitaker's play Expectations. Scenkonstgalan 2015 awarded GEST with the prize ‘Årets Katharsis’ for the production of Constellations.

Productions 
 After Miss Julie (2006) by Patrick Marber
 The Collector (2007) by Mark Healy
 After the End (2008) by Dennis Kelly
 Stones in His Pockets (2009) by Marie Jones. By arrangement with Paul Elliott, Adam Kenwright and Pat Moylan
 Contractions (2010) by Mike Bartlett
 Cock (2010) by Mike Bartlett
 This Wide Night (2011) by Chloë Moss
 My Romantic History (2011) by D. C. Jackson
 Expectations (2012) by Kristina Brändén Whitaker
 Fly Me to the Moon (2012) by Marie Jones
 Foxfinder (2013) by Dawn King
 The Woman in Black (2013) by Stephen Mallatratt and Susan Hill
 Belongings (2014) by Morgan Lloyd Malcolm
 Constellations / One Day When We Were Young (2015) by Nick Payne
 Yen (2015) by Anna Jordan
 The Events (2016) by David Greig. Composed by John Browne
 These Halcyon Days (2016) by Deirdre Kinahan
 Offline (2016) by Kristina Brändén Whitaker, Elizabeth Neale and James Hogg
 Broken Biscuits (2017) by Tom Wells

Visiting Productions 
 Grounded (2014) by George Brant
 Woody Allen(ish) (2016) by Simon Schatzberger
 Pope Head: The Secret Life of Francis Bacon (2017) by Garry Roost

References

Theatres in Sweden
Culture in Gothenburg